Bhishmaka, also called Hiranyaroman, is the Bhoja-Yadava king of Vidarbha in Hinduism. He is the father of the goddess Rukmini, the chief wife of the god Krishna and an incarnation of the goddess Lakshmi.

Legend

Skanda Purana 
The Skanda Purana describes Bhishmaka to be a wealthy and powerful monarch. At the time of the birth of Rukmini, the text describes a celestial voice instructing him to marry his daughter to a four-armed one (Caturbhujā) who had been born on earth. After eight years, he betroths his daughter to Shishupala upon the insistence of the latter's father, Damaghosha, who tells him that Caturbhujā was an epithet of his son. Krishna and Balarama are invited to the betrothal ceremony by Bhishmaka, upon which Krishna elopes with his daughter after they fall in love with each other.

Harivamsha 
In the Harivamsha, when the king Bhishmaka's eldest son Rukmi chooses to marry his sister Rukmini off to suitors through a svayamvara ceremony, the king opposes Rukmi's decision, regarding it to be bad conduct on his part. When the king grants an audience to Krishna, he begs the god's forgiveness for this folly, upon which the latter agrees with his opinion, revealing that the bride was in fact Lakshmi, the goddess of prosperity. He assures the king that this was no sin on his part. Bhishmaka offers many exultations of Krishna before the god's departure.

References

Mythological Indian monarchs
Vidarbha
Characters in the Bhagavata Purana
Characters in the Mahabharata
People related to Krishna